The 2014 Abilene Christian Wildcats football team represented Abilene Christian University as a member of the Southland Conference during the 2014 NCAA Division I FCS football season. Led by third-year head coach Ken Collums, the Wildcats compiled an overall record of 6–6 with a conference mark of 4–4, finishing in a three-way tie for sixth place in the Southland. This was Abilene Christian's first season in the Southland Conference and their second transition season at the NCAA Division I Football Championship Subdivision (FCS) level. The Wildcats played their home games at Shotwell Stadium in Abilene, Texas.

Schedule

* Games aired on a tape delayed basis

Game summaries

Georgia State

Sources:

Northern Arizona

Sources:

Troy

Sources:

Incarnate Word

Sources:

Houston Baptist

Sources:

Lamar

Sources:

Ave Maria

Sources:

McNeese State

Sources:

Sam Houston State

Sources:

Central Arkansas

Sources:

Northwestern State

Stephen F. Austin

Sources:

Roster

References

Abilene Christian
Abilene Christian Wildcats football seasons
Abilene Christian Wildcats football